In Concert – Brandeis University 1963 is an album from a concert performed by American singer-songwriter Bob Dylan at the Brandeis Folk Festival at Brandeis University in Waltham, Massachusetts, on May 10, 1963.

A tape of the concert was found in the basement of San Francisco critic Ralph Gleason, a co-founder of Rolling Stone magazine, after Gleason's death, and was issued in 2010 by Columbia Records. It was offered as a bonus disc by Amazon.com with either The Bootleg Series Vol. 9 – The Witmark Demos: 1962-1964 or Dylan's The Original Mono Recordings for a limited time after its release. The album was officially released on April 12, 2011 in the United States, and a day earlier in Europe.

Track listing

References

External links 
 

2011 live albums
Bob Dylan live albums
Columbia Records live albums
Albums recorded at Brandeis University